NBA Live 2002 is the 2002 installment of the NBA Live video games series. The cover features Steve Francis as a member of the Houston Rockets. The game was developed by EA Sports and released on October 30, 2001, for the PlayStation 2 and PlayStation, and November 15, 2001, for the Xbox. This game was commentated by Don Poier and former NBA player Bob Elliot. It was a launch title for Xbox in North America and Europe.

Soundtrack
 Moka Only - Crunch
 Moka Only (feat Abstract Rude) - Rolling Along
 Swollen Members - Lady Venom
 Swollen Members - Deep End
 The Crystal Method - The Winner

Reception

The PlayStation and Xbox versions received "generally favorable reviews", while the PlayStation 2 version received "average" reviews, according to video game review aggregator Metacritic. NextGen said in its final issue, "This Xbox version of EA Sports' hoops series is basically the same game you can find on every other platform – in other words, chock full of uninspiring graphics, plodding gameplay, and clumsy controls." In Japan, where the PlayStation 2 version was ported and published by Electronic Arts Victor on January 1, 2002, followed by the Xbox version on March 7, Famitsu gave it a score of 29 out of 40 for the former, and 28 out of 40 for the latter.

References

External links
 

2001 video games
Electronic Arts games
NBA Live
NuFX games
PlayStation (console) games
PlayStation 2 games
Xbox games
Video games developed in Canada
Video games set in 2001
Video games set in 2002

ru:NBA Live 2002